James Wilson was a British cinematographer.

The film historians Steve Chibnall and Brian McFarlane describe his work for the B movie production company The Danzigers in the 1950s as one of the company's "strongest assets", especially in his ability to create a sense of "unillusioned grimness".

Selected filmography

 One of the Best (1927)
 Balaclava (1928)
 A South Sea Bubble (1928)
 The Man from Chicago (1930)
 Symphony in Two Flats (1930)
 Keepers of Youth (1931)
 Potiphar's Wife (1931)
 The Flying Fool (1931)
 Lord Camber's Ladies (1932)
 The Indiscretions of Eve (1932)
 Maid Happy (1933)
 Radio Parade (1933)
 What Happened Then? (1934)
 The Scotland Yard Mystery (1934)
 The Secret of the Loch (1934)
 Play Up the Band (1935)
 Death Drives Through (1935)
 The Crouching Beast (1935)
 Ball at Savoy (1936)
 Second Bureau (1936)
 The Avenging Hand (1936)
 The Luck of the Irish (1936)
 The Wife of General Ling (1937)
 Wake Up Famous (1937)
 Return of a Stranger (1937)
 Secret Journey (1939)
 What Would You Do, Chums? (1939)
 The Second Mr. Bush (1940)
 Old Mother Riley's Circus (1941)
 Salute John Citizen (1942)
 We'll Smile Again (1942)
 The Shipbuilders (1943)
 Theatre Royal (1943)
 Strawberry Roan (1944)
 The Echo Murders (1945)
 Twilight Hour (1945)
 Appointment with Crime (1946)
 Mrs. Fitzherbert (1947)
 Woman to Woman (1947)
 Dual Alibi (1947)
 Counterblast (1948)
 Don't Say Die (1950)
 Take Me to Paris (1951)
 Old Mother Riley's Jungle Treasure (1951)
 The Gay Dog (1954)
 Not So Dusty (1956)
 On the Run (1958)
 Identity Unknown (1960)
 The Spider's Web (1960)
 The Tell-Tale Heart (1960)
 So Evil, So Young (1961)
 The Court Martial of Major Keller (1961)
 She Knows Y'Know (1962)
 The Silent Invasion (1962)
 Incident at Midnight (1963)
 Ricochet (1963)
 Five to One (1963)
 The Verdict (1964)
 Game for Three Losers (1965)
 Change Partners (1965)

References

External links
 

Date of birth unknown
Date of death unknown
British cinematographers